Sandberg is a municipality in the district of Rhön-Grabfeld in Bavaria in Germany.

Geography

Location 
Sandberg lies within the Main-Rhön regional planning region.

Subdivisions 
Sandberg is divided into nine municipal subdivisions or villages:

References

Rhön-Grabfeld